Krista Thompson (born June 15, 1972 in Chatham, New Brunswick) is a former field hockey goalkeeper from Canada, who earned a total number of 19 international caps for the Canadian National Team during her career. She was a student (Master's Degree) at the University of Victoria, and assistant coach of that university team.

International senior tournaments
 1995 – Pan American Games, Mar del Plata, Argentina (3rd)
 1997 – World Cup Qualifier, Harare, Zimbabwe (11th)
 2001 – World Cup Qualifier, Amiens/Abbeville, France (10th)

External links
 Profile on Field Hockey Canada

1972 births
Living people
Canadian female field hockey players
Canadian field hockey coaches
Sportspeople from New Brunswick
University of Victoria alumni